Garryn Bek of the planet Cairn is a fictional extraterrestrial superhero character published by DC Comics. Created by Keith Giffen, Bill Mantlo, and Todd McFarlane, the character first appeared in Invasion! #1 (January 1989), and went on to become a founding member of L.E.G.I.O.N.

Publication history
As a member of the titular group, Garryn appeared in  L.E.G.I.O.N. '89 (February 1989) through L.E.G.I.O.N. '94 (September 1994) by Keith Giffen, Alan Grant, and Kevin Maguire returning several issues later in the follow-up series R.E.B.E.L.S. '94 (October 1994) through R.E.B.E.L.S. '96 (March 1996) by Tom Peyer and Arnie Jorgensen. Bek makes two minor unnamed appearances in Infinite Crisis #1 (December 2005) and Rann-Thanagar War: Infinite Crisis Special #1 (April 2006).

Fictional character biography

Invasion!

For years, Garryn Bek served on the planet Cairn's police force. Imprisoned on the Citadelian-run Starlag prison asteroid during the Dominator-led Alien Alliance's invasion of Earth, Garryn shares a cell with Adam Strange, who mysteriously disappears, and next with Vril Dox II. When Dox masterminds an escape plan, Bek and other inmates, including future L.E.G.I.O.N. teammates participate in a riot and successfully escape the prison.

L.E.G.I.O.N.

Traveling aboard a commandeered ship, the first stop for Bek and other former inmates is Colu, Dox's homeworld.  Through the manipulations of Dox, the group assists in his liberation of Colu from the control of the ruling computer tyrants. On the heels of this victory, Dox unilaterally decides to take the troupe to Beks' homeworld, Cairn, which is ruled by drug lords. It is here, after empowering the police force of Zalman City, installing himself as commissioner and overthrowing (and killing many of) the world's drug lords, that Dox's growing organization is dubbed Licensed Extra-Governmental Interstellar Operatives Network (L.E.G.I.O.N.), with the former inmates as officers and the Coluan forces as rank-and-file.

The first Cairn drug lord killed is Kanis-Biz, father of Bek's estranged wife, Marij'n Bek. Marij'n, enlisted to clone Dox after he is killed by Stealth, leverages her importance to the organization to exert control over Bek in hopes of re-establishing a romantic connection with him. Uninterested and seemingly disgusted by Marij'n's large size, Bek does all he can to avoid spending time with her.

While orbiting the planet Rista, Bek encounters the Emerald Eye of Ekron, a sentient mystical object of near unlimited power. The Eye chooses Bek as its new "beholder", and it quickly becomes unclear which of the two is in control. Under the influence, Bek slays two innocent L.E.G.I.O.N. employees. The Eye soon chooses Marij'n as a "co-beholder", but shortly abandons them both in reverse succession. Marij'n, physically slimmed by the powers of the Eye rebuffs Bek's new-found affections and the two do not rekindle a romantic relationship.

They do continue working as colleagues, often getting into more trouble such as when murderous infiltrators attacked the headquarters. This came after the group's clients were overrun with the rumour the entire place was closing down. Another infiltration attempt goes awry despite Bek's direction of the security forces. Bek spent some time neglecting his duties when he snuck off a to a jungle planet. He succeeds in his purpose, interrupting Captain Comet romancing his ex-wife Marij'n.

When Dox's son Lyrl usurps control over L.E.G.I.O.N., Bek joins Dox's newly formed opposition group R.E.B.E.L.S. After Lyrl is defeated, Bek and his comrades once again assume control of L.E.G.I.O.N. Separately, Bek is involved in an effort to stop his old comrade Lobo from killing the earthman Mike Carlin. Since that time, Bek continues to serve as a capable administrator for the organization, most recently appearing unnamed in the events of Infinite Crisis.

Powers and abilities
On his own, Garryn Bek has no extra-human abilities and shows lackluster combat skills. He is an exemplary administrator and pilot.

Through his connection with the Emerald Eye of Ekron, Bek had access to near limitless power. Responding to (and also affecting) Bek's will, the Eye exhibited abilities to produce force fields, emit energy blasts, and manipulate the mind.

Alternate versions
Bek organizes a resistance cell to Dox's ever increasing tyranny in the Armageddon 2001 crossover. He recruits a band of former L.E.G.I.O.N. members, but it ends badly.

In other media
Garryn Bek appears in DC Super Hero Girls: Intergalactic Games, voiced by John DiMaggio.

External links
Cosmic Teams: Garryn & Marij'n Bek

References

Comics characters introduced in 1989
DC Comics superheroes
DC Comics aliens
DC Comics extraterrestrial superheroes
DC Comics police officers
Characters created by Bill Mantlo
Characters created by Keith Giffen
Characters created by Todd McFarlane